Petru Rareș National College may refer to one of three educational institutions in Romania:

Petru Rareș National College (Beclean)
Petru Rareș National College (Piatra Neamț)
Petru Rareș National College (Suceava)